Charles Bailey may refer to:

 Charles G. Bailey, faculty manager of WMUL, Marshall University
 Charles Justin Bailey (1859–1946), American soldier
 Charles P. Bailey (pilot) (1918–2001), one of the Tuskegee Airmen's most decorated combat fighter pilots
 Charles P. Bailey (surgeon) (1910–1993), American pioneer in heart surgery
 Charles R. Bailey, American Army chaplain
 Charles W. Bailey II (1929–2012), American journalist, newspaper editor and novelist
 Charles Bailey (medium) (1870–1947), Australian apport medium
 Charlie Bailey (American football) (born 1940), American football coach
 Charlie Bailey (footballer) (born 1997), English footballer

See also
 Charles Baily (1815–1878), English architect and archaeologist
 Charles Bayly (fl. c. 1630–1680), first overseas governor of the Hudson's Bay Company
 Charles Baillie (disambiguation)